The First Kohl cabinet (German: Kabinett Kohl I) was the 13th Cabinet of the Federal Republic of Germany. It was sworn in on 4 October 1982 following a successful constructive vote of no confidence, by which Helmut Kohl replaced Helmut Schmidt as Chancellor. It was the first (and as yet only) German federal cabinet formed after a constructive vote of no confidence. After ascending to the chancellorship, Kohl and his coalition sought to bring about new elections as quickly as possible, which he achieved by deliberately losing a confidence motion and then having the Bundestag dissolved by the president at the chancellor's request. The following 1983 federal election on 6 March 1983 resulted in a re-election of Kohl and his newly formed CDU/CSU/FDP-coalition. On 30 March 1983, Kohl was again elected chancellor by the Bundestag and formed his second cabinet. With a duration of just under half a year, the cabinet Kohl I was the shortest-lived German government since the cabinet von Schleicher (3 December 1932–28 January 1933) during the Weimar Republic and is, as yet, the shortest-lived cabinet in the history of the Federal Republic.

Composition

|}

References

Kohl I
Kohl
1982 establishments in West Germany
1983 disestablishments in West Germany
Cabinets established in 1982
Cabinets disestablished in 1983
Helmut Kohl